Les hommes ne pensent qu'à ça , is a French comedy film from 1954, directed by Yves Robert, written by Jean Bellanger, starring Jean-Marie Amato and Louis de Funès.

Cast 
 Jean-Marie Amato : Don Juan
 Jean Bellanger : Alfred, the timid lover
 Louisa Colpeyn : the Russian Countess
 Catherine Erard : Nicole, the cheese seller, who loves Alfred
 Jacques Fabbri : Monsieur Jacques, the butcher's boy
 Gabrielle Fontan : the old lady on the staircase
 Jacques Hilling : King Dagobert / a walker
 Geneviève Morel : the mother who marries her daughter off
 Jacques Morel : the perfect seducer
 Annie Noël : Poupette, a curator
 Guy Pierrault : Baron Haissmann / a republican / a walker
 Louis de Funès : Mr Célosso, the Spanish husband of the Russian Countess
 Yves Robert : the war veteran / a walker

References

External links 
 
 Les Hommes ne pensent qu'à ça (1954) at the Films de France

1954 films
French comedy films
1950s French-language films
French black-and-white films
Films directed by Yves Robert
1954 comedy films
1950s French films